Crewe Hill is a country house near Crewe by Farndon, to the southeast of the village of Farndon, Cheshire, England. It was enlarged from a farmhouse for the Barnston family of Churton Hall in the early 19th century.  In about 1890 it was extended, including the addition of a dining room to the rear.  The building is rendered, and has slate roofs.  It is in two storeys, and is symmetrical, with a central gable and wings with gables.  A cottage is attached to its right.  Internally there is a central Great Hall rising through both storeys.  This has a gallery and contains a collection of items of antiquarianism.  The house and the attached cottage are recorded in the National Heritage List for England as a designated Grade listed building.

References

Houses completed in the 19th century
Country houses in Cheshire
Grade II listed buildings in Cheshire
Cheshire West and Chester